The 1977 FIA European Formula 3 Championship was the third edition of the FIA European Formula 3 Championship. The championship consisted of 14 rounds across the continent. The season was won by Italian Piercarlo Ghinzani, with Anders Olofsson second and Nelson Piquet in third. Points were awarded in 9-6-4-3-2-1 fashion to the first six well-placed drivers.

Calendar

Results

Championship standings

Drivers' championship

References

External links 

1977 in motorsport
FIA European Formula 3 Championship